General elections were held in Liberia in 1907. In the presidential election Arthur Barclay of the True Whig Party was re-elected for a third term. It was the first time a President had been elected to a four-year term, as all had previously served for two years.

References

Liberia
1907 in Liberia
Elections in Liberia
Election and referendum articles with incomplete results